Orinus is a genus of Asian plants in the grass family.

 Species
 Orinus alticulmus L.B.Cai & Tong L.Zhang - Qinghai
 Orinus anomala Keng f. - Qinghai, Sichuan
 Orinus kokonorica (K.S.Hao) Keng - Gansu, Qinghai
 Orinus longiglumis X.Su & L.B.Cai - Tibet
 Orinus thoroldii (Stapf ex Hemsl.) Bor - Qinghai, Xinjiang, Tibet, Kashmir, Nepal, Uttarakhand, Kazakhstan, Kyrgyzstan, Uttar Pradesh
 Orinus tibeticus N.X.Zhao - Tibet

References

Chloridoideae
Poaceae genera
Grasses of Asia
Grasses of China
Flora of Central Asia
Flora of temperate Asia
Taxa named by A. S. Hitchcock